The siege of Namur can refer to a number of sieges of the city of Namur in Belgium:

 Siege of Namur (1577) - John of Austria takes the citadel by surprise
 Siege of Namur (1692) by the French (under Louis XIV and Vauban)
 Siege of Namur (1695) by the Allies (Dutch, English and Brandenburgers)
  by the French, during the War of the Austrian Succession
 Siege of Namur (1792) by the French, during the War of the First Coalition
 Siege of Namur (1914) by the Germans, during World War I

See also
Fortified Position of Namur